Kabelo Mabalane (born 15 December 1976), known by his stage name as Kabelo or Bouga Luv, is a South African kwaito musician, songwriter and actor. He is a member of the kwaito trio TKZee. He has opened shows for world famous musicians such as Jay-Z, 50 Cent, Ja Rule and Rihanna. He co-owns Faith Records, a South African independent music company. He has also been a judge on SA's Got Talent for the past two seasons in 2014.

Music career

In 2000 Kabelo released his debut studio album Everybody Watching, including the hit singles "Pantsula For Life" and "Amasheleni". The album went platinum within weeks of its release, selling 100 000 copies. He soon made a followed up release with his second studio album titled Rebel With A Cause including the hit singles "It's My House" and "Ayeye". The album proved to be another huge success, reaching platinum status, selling 130 000 copies.

Kabelo won a South African Music Award in 2003 for his second studio album, Rebel with a Cause. He won the 2004 Kora Award for Best Southern Africa Male Artist.

In 2005, Kabelo signed a deal with Reebok to produce a sneaker called Bouga Luv.

He has run the Comrades Marathon on three occasions from 2006 to 2008. In 2008 he finished just under the 10-hour mark. He also featured on the August 2008 cover of Runner's World magazine.

Along with his TKZEE bandmates (Tokollo Tshabalala and Zwai Bala), Kabelo performed at 2010 Fifa World Cup Opening Ceremony.

Throughout high school, Kabelo was very active in sports. In 2005 he started to prepare for the Comrades Marathon, a 93 km race. Since 2006, to date, he has entered and completed five of the races. In 2008 the South African Sports Confederation Olympics Committee (SASCOC) chose him as an Olympic Ambassador.

In April 2010 Kabelo was named as the presenter of a new multi-sport and lifestyle talk-show on South Africa's SABC2 channel that airs on Fridays at 21:30.

At the 30th SAB Sports Journalist of the Year Awards, on 6 September 2010, Kabelo was rewarded with two awards, in Best Newcomer Overall and Best Newcomer Television Presenter.

Personal life 
Kabelo married South African actress, Gail Nkoane, in a private ceremony on 9 February 2013. The couple have two children together; a daughter, Zoe Leano Mabalane, was born on 28 March 2015 and a son named Khumo born on 31 Jan 2018. In a recent interview with MacG (Podcast and Chill with MacG), Kabelo spoke of his past, music and fellow Kwaito colleagues, his parents, GBV and God. Mabalane is widely considered one of the best selling kwaito artists of all time.

Discography

Solo albums

2000: Everybody Watching
2002: Rebel With A Cause
2003: And the Beat Goes On
2004: Bouga Luv Album
2006: Exodus
2007: I'm A King
2011: Immortal - Vol. 1
2012: Immortal - Vol. 2
2015: Immortal - Vol 3

Albums with TKZee
1996: Take It Eazy
1997: Phalafala
1998: Shibobo
1998: Halloween
1999: Guz 2001 (TKZee family)
2001: Trinity
2005: Guz hits
2009: ''Coming Home'

References

1976 births
Living people
South African Tswana people
Kwaito musicians
Alumni of St Stithians College
South African musicians